Virginie Amélie Avegno Gautreau (née Avegno; 29 January 1859 – 25 July 1915) was an American-born Parisian socialite, who gained notoriety as the subject of John Singer Sargent's painting Portrait of Madame X. The suggestion of indiscreet posing in a revealing costume provoked a storm of outrage.

Early life and education
Gautreau was born Virginie Amélie of European Creole ancestry, in New Orleans, Louisiana, on 29 January 1859, the daughter of Anatole Placide Avegno (3 July 1835 – 7 April 1862) and Marie Virginie de Ternant of Parlange Plantation, a descendant of French nobility. Her grandmother was Virginie de Ternant, founder of the plantation; Louisiana senator and judge Charles Parlange was her maternal uncle. She had a sister, Valentine Marie, who died as a young child of yellow fever. Their parents were white Creoles; their father Anatole was the son of Philippe Avegno (originally Italian) and Catherine Genois.
 
Her father Anatole Avegno served as a major in the Confederate States Army during the American Civil War; he died in 1862 in the Battle of Shiloh. He was the commander of the Avegno Zouaves of New Orleans, a cosmopolitan battalion which had soldiers from a wide variety of ethnic backgrounds including French, Spanish, Mexican, Irish, Italian, Chinese, German, Dutch, and Filipino.

In 1867, when Virginie was eight years old, her widowed mother moved with her to France. The girl was educated in Paris and introduced to French high society.

Parisienne

Virginie Avegno became one of Paris's conspicuous beauties, as she was a pale-skinned brunette with fine, cameo-like features and an hourglass figure. She was known to use lavender-colored face and body powder to enhance her complexion, to dye her hair with henna, and to color her eyebrows. She attracted much admiration due to her elegance and style.  She also attracted much amorous attention that she did not discourage, and her extramarital affairs were so well known that they became the subject of tabloid scandal sheets and gossip handbills.  

One of her lovers was Samuel Jean Pozzi, a gynecologist and art collector. His portrait, Dr. Pozzi at Home,  had been painted by the young aspiring John Singer Sargent, a former pupil of French master Carolus Duran.  Sargent, anxious to popularize himself by capitalizing on Virginie's notoriety, asked Dr. Pozzi (whom he had painted in a papal-red robe) to introduce him to Virginie, which the doctor did, resulting in Sargent's being invited to the Gautreaus' Brittany chateau, Les Chênes, where Sargent produced some 30 studies of her in pencil, watercolor and oil.

Marriage and family
She married Pierre Gautreau, a French banker and shipping magnate. She had a daughter named Louise Gautreau (1879–1911).

Madame X

She posed for paintings by several noted 19th-century painters, including Gustave Courtois (1891) and Antonio de La Gándara. (1898) but it was Sargent's 1884 portrait of her that he had entered in the Paris Salon of that year under the title Portrait of Madame X that would become by far the most famous.  This was because the woman's suggestively coquettish pose and revealing costume so offended French sensibility as indiscreetly suggesting the woman's reputation that it provoked a firestorm of outrage and was regarded as scandalous.  One French critic wrote that if one stood before the portrait during its exhibition in the Salon, one "would hear every curseword in the French language."  It was not that a woman of Virginie's station in society would not pose as a model (after all, no scandal attached to her posing afterwards for both Courtois and de la Gándara), it was that Sargent was seen as having openly defied convention by flaunting the woman's immoral lifestyle. Gautreau's mother implored Sargent to remove the portrait from the Salon, but the most he would do was change the title to "Portrait of Madame X," by which it has ever since been known.  The scandal guaranteed that Sargent would receive no more portrait commissions in France, and he decamped for London for good, where he became one of history's most famous portraitists, of the upper classes in Britain and America.  The scandal caused Gautreau to retire from society for some time although she still carried on.

Antonio de La Gándara painted a full-length portrait of her, entitled Madame Gautreau (1898). In tonality of colors, privacy of her face, and style of her dress, it was more conservative than Sargent's painting.

Death 
Gautreau died in Cannes on 25 July 1915. She was buried in the Gautreau family crypt at their Chateau des Chênes in Saint-Malo, Brittany.

Representation in other media
Gautreau's and Sargent's intertwined stories are the subject of Strapless (2004) by Deborah Davis. 
Gautreau is also the subject of I Am Madame X: A Novel (2004) by Gioia Diliberto.

References

American socialites
American expatriates in France
American artists' models
American people of French descent
American people of Italian descent
Louisiana Creole people
People from New Orleans
1859 births
1915 deaths